Hypophloeus is a genus of beetles belonging to the family Tenebrionidae.

Species:
 Hypophloeus maehleri Kulzer, 1956

References

Tenebrionidae